A Tribute to Canadian Songwriters is a concept album by American singer-songwriter and guitarist Billie Hughes of cover recordings of songs by prominent Canadian songwriters from the London, Ontario and Toronto music scene of the ‘70s.  It was released in 1981 on vinyl and re-issued in 2006.

Background 
A Tribute To Canadian Songwriters was conceived as a concept project by Hughes, David Bradstreet and former Lazarus member Carl Keesee, initially released as nine songs on vinyl with the title Horton, Bates & Best: The Last Catch.   It was produced by Hughes, Keesee, and Bradstreet, who engineered the recording at his studio and released it on his independent label, Street Records.  It was reissued digitally with the addition of three songs on January 17, 2006 at iTunes Music Store.

Among the songs chosen are "Sahajiya" written by Brent Titcomb and first released in 1971 as a single by Tommy Graham and Friends, Bruce Cockburn's "Arrows of Light" from his Joy Will Find A Way 1978 album release, "More Often Than Not" written by David Wiffen and first released by Jerry Jeff Walker in 1970, then covered by Eric Anderson in 1972, "Albert's Cove" by David Essig, and "White Lines" written by Willie P. Bennett and recorded by David Wiffen with Bruce Cockburn and Brian Ahern as producers.

Critical reception 
In a glowing review in the Montreal Gazette, John Griffin calls the Bill Hughes album “the first rough gem to be uncovered in the new year” and gives high marks to Billie’s “soaring cut-glass tenor”. Mark Tremblay of the Calgary Herald complimented the sound of the album, writing “The backup instrumentation is crisp and sure, the production uncluttered and tasteful” and “Hughes’ voice and guitar style epitomize folk’s best qualities.”

Personnel 

 Billie Hughes – vocals, guitar, synth

 Carl Keesee – bass, synth, saxophone

 David Bradstreet – engineer

 David Houghton – drums, percussion

 Gary Craig – drums

 Peter Bleakney – bass

 Aidan Mason - guitar

 Matt Zimbel – percussion

 Jane Siberry – background vocals

Production 

 Billie Hughes – producer

 David Bradstreet – producer, engineer

 Carl Keesee – producer

 Bob Carbone – mastering, A&M Studios

 Brenda Bradstreet– graphic design, 1981 vinyl release

 Maurice Cardinal - photography

 Ozan Sokmen – graphic design

References

External links 

 
 

1981 albums
Concept albums